Mecha Nageswara Rao is an Indian politician from Telangana and a member of the Telugu Desam Party. He is a member of the Telangana Legislative Assembly from Aswaraopeta. In April 2021 Mecha Nageswara Rao with another member of Telugu Desam Party joined the ruling Telangana Rashtra Samithi party in the Assembly.

References 

Living people
Telugu Desam Party politicians
Telangana MLAs 2018–2023
Telangana Rashtra Samithi politicians
1965 births